Thomas Leveritt is an Anglo-American artist who works in various media. His roots are in figurative painting, for which he has won the Carroll Medal for Portraiture from the UK's Royal Society of Portrait Painters, and other painting awards from the National Portrait Gallery. He has also won the Betty Trask Award for a first novel from the Society of Authors, as well as the Somerset Maugham Award, for his novel The Exchange-Rate Between Love and Money.

Education
Raised in Dallas, Texas, Tom was sent to boarding school in England at the age of 8. At 13 he won a full scholarship to Harrow School. He went on to study History at Peterhouse, Cambridge, graduating with a double First.

References

External links
Official website of Thomas Leveritt.
Interview The Guardian (2008)
The Exchange-rate Between Love And Money on Amazon.co.uk

1976 births
People educated at Harrow School
Alumni of Peterhouse, Cambridge
21st-century English novelists
20th-century English painters
English male painters
21st-century English painters
Living people
English male novelists
21st-century English male writers
20th-century English male artists
21st-century English male artists